Houston Heights High School (HHHS, formerly Houston Heights Charter) is a public charter high school in Houston, Texas, United States. It was established in 1999 by superintendent Richard Mik.

Located in the Houston Heights neighborhood, it serves 96% at-risk students and partners with Houston Community College to give students the opportunity to gain college credit during their junior and/or senior years, including in the area of construction management.

In 2009, the school was rated "academically acceptable" by the Texas Education Agency.

Athletics
Houston Heights High School offers Men's Basketball, Men's Soccer, and Cheerleading. The basketball team won the Texas Charter School Academic & Athletic League (TCSAAL) state championship in 2010 after finishing runner-up in 2009.

Student body
HHHS had 251 students during the 2007–2008 school year.
 61% were Hispanic
 32% were African-American
 7% were White
 0% were Asian

86% of the students qualified for free or reduced breakfast.

See also
 List of state-chartered charter schools in Houston

References

External links
 

Public high schools in Houston
Public high schools in Harris County, Texas
Charter schools in Houston
Charter high schools in Texas
Educational institutions established in 1999
1999 establishments in Texas
Houston Heights